Velká Jesenice is a municipality and village in Náchod District in the Hradec Králové Region of the Czech Republic. It has about 700 inhabitants.

Administrative parts
Villages of Veselice and Volovka are administrative parts of Velká Jesenice.

References

Villages in Náchod District